Ambadawe is a village in the Mandangad taluk of Ratnagiri district in Maharashtra, India. This village is family origin of B. R. Ambedkar, Architect of constitution of India.

Census data

Notable people
 The family origins of B. R. Ambedkar, the Indian jurist, politician, and social reformer from Maharashtra is from this village. His original surname was Sakpal but his father registered his name to school in Ambadawekar, which comes from this native village name 'Ambadawe'.

References

External links

Villages in Ratnagiri district